International May 12th Awareness Day, also known as International ME/CFS Awareness Day is held every year to raise awareness of myalgic encephalomyelitis (ME)/chronic fatigue syndrome (CFS), fibromyalgia, multiple chemical sensitivity, Gulf War syndrome and other chronic immunological and neurological diseases (CIND).

International May 12th Awareness Day aims to:
 Increase public awareness of the importance of ME/CFS, fibromyalgia, multiple chemical sensitivity, Gulf War syndrome and other chronic immunological and neurological diseases (CIND)
 Educate about the symptoms and impact of myalgic encephalomyelitis/chronic fatigue syndrome, fibromyalgia, and other CINDs
 Advocate for increased research funding, particularly for ME/CFS and fibromyalgia
 Many fundraising events take place on May 12

Illnesses 
The main illnesses involved in International May 12th Awareness Day are ME/CFS, fibromyalgia, multiple chemical sensitivity, and Gulf War syndrome.

Other Chronic Immunological and Neurological Diseases also recognized by the event include Addison's, Alzheimer's, autism, celiac, chronic myofascial pain, Crohn's, epilepsy, irritable bowel disease (IBD), Lou Gehrig's (ALS), lupus, Lyme disease, mold/biotoxin illness, multiple sclerosis (MS), orthostatic intolerance (OI), Parkinson's, postural orthostatic tachycardia syndrome (POTS), reflex sympathetic dystrophy syndrome (RSD), and ulcerative colitis.

Events 
International May 12th Awareness Day is observed by dying hair blue or dressing up in  blue. Since 2016, the #MillionsMissing protests for ME/CFS have taken place every May, with the main event held on May 12. Film screenings are usually held for films about ME/CFS, including Voices from the Shadows, Forgotten Plague, or Unrest. Public landmarks are lit up in color for International May 12th Awareness Day, typically using blue for ME and purple for fibromyalgia.

History
In 2006 a British charity created Severe ME Awareness Day on August 8 as a day of remembrance and understanding for those who died from or with ME. August 8 was chosen because it is the birthday of Sophia Mirza, who was believed to be the first British person to have chronic fatigue syndrome listed as a cause of death.

Related observances
 5/1 – 5/31: Myalgic Encephalomyelitis Awareness Month
 5/1 – 5/31: Fibromyalgia Awareness Month
 5/1 - 5/31: Multiple Chemical Sensitivity Awareness Month
 Week of May 12: Myalgic Encephalomyelitis Awareness Week
 8/8: Severe ME Awareness Day

References

External links
 ME/CFS Awareness Day - CDC
 25 Facts for Fibromyalgia Awareness - Huffington Post

May observances
Awareness days
Observances in the United States
Observances in the United Kingdom
Observances in Canada
Health awareness days
Gulf War syndrome
Chronic fatigue syndrome